The Egyptian Table tennis League is an Egyptian professional league for Egyptian Table tennis clubs, it was started for first time in 1979 before this time there was the "Gomhoria championship" which contain clubs and individual competitions, the winner of Egyptian Table tennis League represents Egypt in Africa Table Tennis Championship and Arab table tennis championship. Al Ahly is the most titled club in Egypt

Champions

Winners by club

References 

Table tennis competitions in Egypt
Table tennis organizations
Sports leagues established in 1979
1979 establishments in Egypt